Saint Phnx (pronounced "saint phoenix" and stylized as SAINT PHNX) are a Scottish musical duo formed by brothers Alan and Stevie Jukes in 2016. Currently signed to Atlantic Records, they released their debut studio album DDMN on 31 January 2020. On 2 July 2021, the band released "Happy Place", a song they wrote in tribute to their father, who died 19 January 2021. Their debut EP Happy Place was released on 28 January 2022.

Saint Phnx have toured with artists such as Imagine Dragons, Yungblud, Arizona, and Lewis Capaldi.

History

2016–2019
Saint Phnx was formed in 2016 by brothers Alan and Stevie Jukes. Previously being members in a band called Vigo Thieves, Saint Phnx started out by releasing some self-released singles, with their debut single Reload being released the same year. The band released their subsequent single "King", which found airplay on UK radio stations, despite not being signed to a record label. The following year in 2017, the band were chosen to support Imagine Dragons at a show at the Roundhouse in London. In 2019, the band made an appearance at South By Southwest, and supported Yungblud on his North American and European tours.

DDMN
Saint Phnx started recording their debut album DDMN in 2018, with the album being released on 31 January 2020.

Happy Place
In 2021, Saint Phnx signed to Atlantic Records. Following the passing of their father on 19 January 2021, Saint Phnx wrote "Happy Place" in his honour and released it as a single on 2 July 2021.

During an interview with Flaunt on the origin of the band's name, vocalist Stevie Jukes stated:

The band later announced their debut EP Happy Place, which was released on 28 January 2022. Following its release, the EP peaked at number 39 on the UK Albums Chart and number 1 on the Scottish Albums Chart.

In May 2022, the band released "Make Us Dream", a song centered around the band's support for Scottish football club Rangers F.C. when they faced German football club Eintracht Frankfurt in the 2022 UEFA Europa League Final.

Members
Stevie Jukes – lead vocals, guitar, bass (2016–present)
Alan Jukes – backing vocals, drums, percussion (2016–present)

Discography

Studio albums

EPs

Singles

Notes

References

External links

Musical groups established in 2016
Musical groups from Glasgow
Atlantic Records artists
Sibling musical duos
Scottish musical duos
Male musical duos